Tectaria triloba is a species of fern in the family Tectariaceae. It is endemic to Ecuador.  Its natural habitats are subtropical or tropical moist lowland forests and subtropical or tropical moist montane forests. It is threatened by habitat loss.

References

triloba
Ferns of Ecuador
Endemic flora of Ecuador
Ferns of the Americas
Data deficient plants
Taxonomy articles created by Polbot
Plants described in 1883